Anoncia diveni is a moth in the family Cosmopterigidae. It was described by Carl Heinrich in 1921. It is found in Honduras, Mexico, and North America, where it has been recorded from Texas.

The larvae feed on Lantana species.

References

Moths described in 1921
Cosmopteriginae
Moths of North America